Helen Graham is a former international lawn bowler from Zambia.

Helen Graham began bowling in 1978 after immigrating there during the same year, she has won the national singles and the Six African States Tournament.
  
She won a bronze medal in the pairs at the 1992 World Outdoor Bowls Championship in Ayr with Margaret Hughes. She also competed in two Commonwealth Games in 1990 and 1994.

References

Zambian female bowls players
Zambian bowls players
Bowls players at the 1990 Commonwealth Games
Bowls players at the 1994 Commonwealth Games
Living people
White Zambian people
Immigrants to Zambia
Year of birth missing (living people)
Commonwealth Games competitors for Zambia